Imbolc or Imbolg, also called Saint Brigid's Day, is a Gaelic traditional festival. It marks the beginning of spring, and for Christians, it is the feast day of Saint Brigid, Ireland's patroness saint. It is held on 1 February, which is about halfway between the winter solstice and the spring equinox. Historically, its traditions were widely observed throughout Ireland, Scotland and the Isle of Man. Imbolc is one of the four Gaelic seasonal festivals, along with: Bealtaine, Lughnasadh and Samhain.

Imbolc is mentioned in early Irish literature, and some evidence suggests it was also an important date in ancient times. It is believed that Imbolc was originally a pagan festival associated with the lambing season and the goddess Brigid. Historians suggest that the saint and her feast day are Christianizations of these. The customs of St Brigid's Day did not begin to be recorded in detail until the early modern era. In recent centuries, its traditions have included weaving Brigid's crosses, hung over doors and windows to protect against fire, illness, and evil spirits. People also made a doll of Brigid (a ), which was paraded around the community by girls, sometimes accompanied by 'strawboys'. Brigid was said to visit one's home on St Brigid's Eve. To receive her blessings, people would make a bed for Brigid, leave her food and drink, and set items of clothing outside for her to bless. Holy wells would be visited, a special meal would be had, and the day was traditionally linked with weather lore.

Although many of its traditions died out in the 20th century, it is still observed by some Christians as a religious holiday and by some non-Christians as a cultural one, and its customs have been revived in some places. Since the latter 20th century, Celtic neopagans and Wiccans have observed Imbolc as a religious holiday. Since 2023, "Imbolc/St Brigid's Day" has been an annual public holiday in the Republic of Ireland.

Origins and etymology
Historians such as Ronald Hutton argue that the festival must have pre-Christian origins. Some scholars argue that the date of Imbolc was significant in Ireland since the Neolithic. A few passage tombs in Ireland are aligned with the sunrise around the times of Imbolc and Samhain. This includes the Mound of the Hostages on the Hill of Tara, and Cairn L at Slieve na Calliagh. Frank Prendergast argues that this alignment is so rare that it is a product of chance.

The etymology of Imbolc or Imbolg is unclear. A common explanation is that it comes from the Old Irish , meaning 'in the belly', and refers to the pregnancy of ewes at this time of year. Joseph Vendryes linked it to the Old Irish verb , 'to wash/cleanse oneself'. He suggested that it referred to a ritual cleansing, similar to the ancient Roman festival Februa or Lupercalia, which took place at the same time of year. Eric P. Hamp derives it from a Proto-Indo-European root meaning both 'milk' and 'cleansing'. Professor Alan Ward derives it from the Proto-Celtic , 'budding'. However, linguists believe this is the writer's respelling of the word to give it an understandable etymology.

The Táin Bó Cúailnge ('Cattle Raid of Cooley') indicates that Imbolc (spelt imolg) is three months after the 1 November festival of Samhain. Imbolc is mentioned in another Old Irish poem about the Táin in the Metrical Dindshenchas: "", which Edward Gwynn translates "after Candlemas, rough was their herding".

Hutton writes that Imbolc must have been "important enough for its date to be dedicated subsequently to Brigid … the Mother Saint of Ireland". Cogitosus, writing in the late 7th century, first mentions a feast day of Saint Brigid being observed in Kildare on 1 February. Brigid is said to have lived in the 6th century and founded the important monastery of Kildare. She became the focus of a major cult. However, there are few historical facts about her, and her early hagiographies "are mainly anecdotes and miracle stories, some of which are deeply rooted in Irish pagan folklore". It is suggested that Saint Brigid is based on the goddess Brigid, or that she was a real person and the lore of the goddess was transferred to her. Like the saint, the goddess is associated with wisdom, poetry, healing, protection, blacksmithing, and domesticated animals, according to Cormac's Glossary and Lebor Gabála Érenn. It is suggested that the festival, which celebrates the start of lambing, is linked with Brigid in her role as a fertility goddess. Hutton says that the goddess might have already been linked to Imbolc and this was continued by making it the saint's feast day. Or it could be that Imbolc's association with milk drew the saint to it because of a legend that she had been the wet-nurse of Christ.

Historic customs
The festival of Imbolc is mentioned in several early Irish manuscripts, but they say very little about its original rites and customs. Imbolc was one of four main seasonal festivals in Gaelic Ireland, along with Beltane (1 May), Lughnasadh (1 August) and Samhain (1 November). The tale Tochmarc Emire, which survives in a 10th-century version, names Imbolc as one of four seasonal festivals, and says it is "when the ewes are milked at spring's beginning". This linking of Imbolc with the arrival of lambs and sheep's milk probably reflected farming customs that ensured lambs were born before calves. In late winter/early spring, sheep could survive better than cows on the sparse vegetation, and farmers sought to resume milking as soon as possible due to their dwindling stores. The Hibernica Minora includes an Old Irish poem about the four seasonal festivals. Translated by Kuno Meyer (1894), it says, "Tasting of each food according to order, this is what is proper at Imbolc: washing the hands, the feet, the head". This suggests ritual cleansing. It has been suggested that originally the timing of the festival was more fluid and associated with the onset of the lambing season, the beginning of preparations for the spring sowing, and the blooming of blackthorn. 

Prominent folklorist Seán Ó Súilleabháin wrote: "The main significance of the Feast of St. Brigid would seem to be that it was a Christianisation of one of the focal points of the agricultural year in Ireland, the starting point of preparations for the spring sowing. Every manifestation of the cult of the saint (or of the deity she replaced) is bound up in some way with food production".

From the 18th century to the mid-20th century, many St Brigid's Day traditions were recorded by folklorists and other writers. They tell us how it was celebrated then and shed light on how it may have been celebrated in the past.

Brigid's crosses

In Ireland, Brigid's crosses (pictured) are traditionally made on St Brigid's Day. A Brigid's cross usually consists of rushes woven into a four-armed equilateral cross, although there were also three-armed crosses. They are traditionally hung over doors, windows, and stables to welcome Brigid and for protection against fire, lightning, illness, and evil spirits. The crosses are generally left until the next St Brigid's Day. Young boys would carry it around the village, inviting people to step through it and be blessed.

Welcoming Brigid

On St Brigid's Eve, Brigid was said to visit virtuous households and bless the inhabitants. As Brigid represented the light half of the year and the power that will bring people from the dark season of winter into spring, her presence was vital at this time of year. 

Before going to bed, people would leave items of clothing or strips of cloth outside for Brigid to bless. The next morning, they would be brought inside and believed to have powers of healing and protection.

Brigid would be symbolically invited into the house and a bed would often be made for her. In Ulster, a family member representing Brigid would circle the home three times carrying rushes. They would knock the door three times, asking to be let in. On the third attempt, they are welcomed in, a meal is had, and the rushes are then made into crosses or a bed for Brigid. In 18th-century Mann, the custom was to stand at the door with a bundle of rushes and say "Brede, Brede, come to my house tonight. Open the door for Brede and let Brede come in". Similarly, in County Donegal, the family member who was sent to fetch the rushes knelt on the front step and repeated three times, "Go on your knees, open your eyes, and let in St Brigid". Those inside the house answered three times, "She's welcome". The rushes were then strewn on the floor as a carpet or bed for Brigid. In the 19th century, some old Manx women would make a bed for Brigid in the barn with food, ale, and a candle on a table. The custom of making Brigid's bed was prevalent in the Hebrides of Scotland, where it was recorded as far back as the 17th century. A bed of hay or a basket-like cradle would be made for Brigid. Someone would then call out three times: "" (", come in; thy bed is ready"). A corn dolly called the dealbh Bríde (icon of Brigid) would be laid in the bed and a white wand, usually made of birch, would be laid beside it. It represented the wand that Brigid was said to use to make the vegetation start growing again. Women in some parts of the Hebrides would also dance while holding a large cloth and calling out "" (", come over and make your bed").

In the Outer Hebrides, ashes from the fire would be raked smooth, and, in the morning, they would look for some mark on the ashes as a sign that Brigid had visited. If there was no mark, they believed bad fortune would come unless they buried a cockerel at the meeting of three streams as an offering and burned incense on their fire that night.

Brigid's procession
In Ireland and Scotland, a representation of Brigid would be paraded around the community by girls and young women. It would be made from rushes or reeds and clad in bits of cloth, flowers, or shells. The girls would carry it in procession while singing a hymn to Brigid. All wore white with their hair unbound as a symbol of purity and youth. Afterward, they feasted in a house with the  set in a place of honour, and put it to bed with lullabies.

Escorted by other girls, she went house-to-house wearing 'Brigid's crown' and carrying 'Brigid's shield' and 'Brigid's cross', all made from rushes. The procession in some places included 'strawboys', who wore conical straw hats, masks and played folk music; much like the wrenboys. Up until the mid-20th century, children in Ireland still went house-to-house asking for pennies for "poor Biddy", or money for the poor. In County Kerry, men in white robes sang from house to house.

Weather lore

The festival is traditionally associated with weather lore, and the old tradition of watching to see if serpents or badgers came from their winter dens may be a forerunner of the North American Groundhog Day. A Scottish Gaelic proverb about the day is:

Imbolc was believed to be when the Cailleach—the divine hag of Gaelic tradition—gathers her firewood for the rest of the winter. Legend has it that if she wishes to make the winter last a good while longer, she will make sure the weather on Imbolc is bright and sunny so that she can gather plenty of firewood. Therefore, people would be relieved if Imbolc is a day of foul weather, as it means the Cailleach is asleep and winter is almost over.

Other customs
Families would have a special meal or supper on St Brigid's Eve to mark the last night of winter. This typically included food such as colcannon, sowans, dumplings, barmbrack or bannocks. Often, some of the food and drink would be set aside for Brigid.

In Ireland, a spring cleaning was customary around St Brigid's Day.

People traditionally visit holy wells and pray for health while walking 'sunwise' around the well. They might then leave offerings, typically coins or strips of cloth/ribbon (see clootie well). Historically, water from the well was used to bless the home, family members, livestock, and fields.

Scottish writer Donald Alexander Mackenzie also recorded in the 19th century that offerings were made "to earth and sea". The offering could be milk poured into the ground or porridge poured into the water as a libation.

In County Kilkenny, graves were decorated with box and laurel flowers (or any other flowers that could be found at that time). A Branch of Virginity was decorated with white ribbons and placed on the grave of a recently deceased maiden.

Today

Today, St Brigid's Day and Imbolc are observed by Christians and non-Christians. Some people still make Brigid's crosses and s or visit holy wells dedicated to St Brigid on 1 February. Brigid's Day parades have been revived in the town of Killorglin, County Kerry, which holds a yearly "Biddy's Day Festival". There are folk music sessions, historical talks, film screenings, drama productions, and cross-weaving workshops. The main event is a torchlight parade of 'Biddy groups' through the town. Since 2009 a yearly "Brigid of Faughart Festival" is held in County Louth. This celebrates Brigid as both saint and goddess and includes the long-standing pilgrimage to Faughart as well as music, poetry, and lectures.

The "Imbolc International Music Festival" of folk music is held in Derry at this time of year. In England, the village of Marsden, West Yorkshire holds a biennial "Imbolc Fire Festival" which includes a lantern procession, fire performers, music, fireworks, and a symbolic battle between giant characters representing the Green Man and Jack Frost.

More recently, Irish embassies have hosted yearly events on St Brigid's Day to celebrate famous women of the Irish diaspora and showcase the work of Irish female emigrants in the arts. In 2022, Dublin hosted its first "Brigit Festival", celebrating "the contributions of Irish women" past and present through exhibitions, tours, lectures, films, and a concert.

From 2023, "Imbolc/St Brigid's Day" will be a yearly public holiday in the Republic of Ireland to mark both the saint's feast day and the seasonal festival. A government statement noted that it would be the first Irish public holiday named after a woman, and "means that all four of the traditional Celtic seasonal festival will now be public holidays".

Neopaganism

Imbolc or Imbolc-based festivals are observed by some Neopagans, though practices vary widely. While some attempt to closely emulate the historic accounts of Imbolc, others rely on many sources to inspire their celebrations. Festivals typically fall near 1 February in the Northern Hemisphere and 1 August in the Southern Hemisphere. 

Some Neopagans celebrate the festival at the astronomical midpoint between the winter solstice and spring equinox, while others rely on the full moon nearest this point. In the Northern Hemisphere, this is usually on 3 or 4 February. Some Neopagans designate Imbolc based on other natural phenomena, such as the emergence of primroses, dandelions, or similar local flora.

Celtic Reconstructionist
Celtic Reconstructionists strive to reconstruct ancient Celtic religion. Their religious practices are based on research and historical accounts, but may be modified slightly to suit modern life. They avoid syncretism (i.e., combining practises from different cultures). They usually celebrate the festival when the first stirrings of spring are felt or on the full moon nearest this. Many use traditional songs and rites from sources such as The Silver Bough and The Carmina Gadelica. It is a time of honouring the goddess Brigid, and many of her dedicants choose this time of year for rituals to her.

Wicca and Neo-Druidry

Wiccans and Neo-Druids celebrate Imbolc as one of the eight Sabbats in their Wheel of the Year, following Midwinter and preceding Ostara. In Wicca, Imbolc is commonly associated with the goddess Brigid; as such, it is sometimes seen as a "women's holiday" with specific rites only for female members of a coven. Among Dianic Wiccans, Imbolc is the traditional time for initiations.

See also

 Candlemas
 
 Irish calendar
 Lichun
 Quarter days
 Vasant Panchami
 Wheel of the Year (Cross-Quarter days)

References

Bibliography

Further reading
 Carmichael, Alexander (1992) Carmina Gadelica: Hymns and Incantations (with illustrative notes onwards, rites, and customs dying and obsolete/ orally collected in the Highlands and Islands of Scotland) Hudson, NY, Lindisfarne Press, 
 Chadwick, Nora (1970) The Celts London, Penguin. 
 McNeill, F. Marian (1959) The Silver Bough, Vol. 1–4. William MacLellan, Glasgow
 Ó Catháin, Séamas (1995) Festival of Brigit

August observances
Cross-quarter days
February observances
Gaelic culture
Holidays in Scotland
Public holidays in the Republic of Ireland
Irish mythology
Modern pagan holidays
Scottish mythology
Winter holidays (Northern Hemisphere)